Atlanta State Park is a state park in northeast Texas in the United States.  It is located on Wright Patman Lake in northern Cass County.

Location

The entrance to the park is on highway FM-1154.

History

The state of Texas acquired the land for Atlanta State Park in 1954, under a long-term lease with the Department of the Army.  In past centuries, the Caddo Indians settled in this area and worked the land as farmers.

Recreation

Atlanta State Park provides access to Wright Patman Lake for boating and fishing, and has a sandy beach area for swimming.  Picnic and overnight camping areas are available.  The park includes a nature trail and a  hiking trail.

References

External links
 Atlanta State Park

Protected areas of Cass County, Texas
State parks of Texas
1954 establishments in Texas
Protected areas established in 1954